

James Auckland (born 1 April 1980) is a former professional British tennis player.

His highest ATP singles ranking was 282nd, which he reached on 6 February 2006. While his career high in doubles was at 57 set at 9 April 2007.

Auckland was given a wildcard into the main draw of the men's singles at 2002 Wimbledon, but was forced to withdraw due to injury. His place was taken by lucky loser, Denis Golovanov.

Auckland played for the Kansas City Explorers of World TeamTennis during the 2008 season and for the Boston Lobsters in 2009.

In April 2013, James joined tennis coaching and management company Premier Tennis as Director of Tennis, where he designs and oversees a variety of coaching programmes and takes responsibility for coach development and training.

Performance timeline

Doubles

ATP Career Finals

Doubles: 1 (1 runner-up)

ATP Challenger and ITF Futures finals

Singles: 5 (1–4)

Doubles: 29 (8–21)

References

External links
 
 

1980 births
Living people
English expatriate sportspeople in the United States
English male tennis players
Sportspeople from Norwich
British male tennis players
Tennis people from Norfolk